The National Herbal Park is a  park located near the Naypyidaw-Taungnyo Road in Naypyidaw, Myanmar. Over 20,000 herbal and medicinal plants, representing over 700 species from the various states and divisions of Myanmar, are grown in the park.  The herbal park is part of the government's efforts to protect and preserve the herbs from depletion and extinction and to keep alive the country's traditional system of medicines. It opened on 4 January 2008. There is no entry fee.

See also
 Naypyidaw Safari Park
 Naypyidaw Water Fountain Garden
 Naypyidaw Zoological Gardens

References

Parks in Myanmar
Health in Myanmar
Naypyidaw
2008 establishments in Myanmar